To the Center is the debut studio album by the stoner rock band Nebula. It was released in 1999 on Sub Pop, The album was later reissued in 2018 by the band's current label, Heavy Psych Sounds Records.

Production
Recorded in Seattle, the album was produced with Jack Endino. Guitar player Eddie Glass employed a Gibson SG.

Mark Arm sang on the band's cover of the Stooges' "I Need Somebody".

Critical reception
Exclaim! wrote that Glass "transformed himself into a veritable guitar god almost overnight in an era wherein the slightest six-string noodling is waved off the road, considered indulgent." The Chicago Tribune thought that "acoustic guitars, sitar, [and] synthesizer give this Hendrix-like trio added texture." OC Weekly decided that "the band also gets a little groovy, pulling out the aural incense to jam on the Fugazi-like 'Freedom' and synthesizer-laced, Jefferson Airplane-ish 'Synthetic Dream'."

The Province determined that "this power trio seems to have blotted up its churn and burn from ancient Frisco acid rock band, Blue Cheer." Tucson Weekly deemed To the Center "an album which undeniably pushes the band to the forefront of its genre, whether or not you've got a bong in front of you."

Houston Press wrote: "On a song such as 'Come Down', Nebula actually does what few '90s bands have ever done, chemically enhanced or not: It achieves true heaviness. After the song's simple three-note syncopated intro doubles back on itself, Glass scratches his guitar pick down his strings before singing the hurried lyrics. And it's during those one and a half seconds, the time it takes for Glass's pick to travel a few inches, that Nebula is the heaviest band on earth. Not since Ritchie Blackmore's days with Deep Purple has the simple gesture of pick scratching been used so perfectly."

AllMusic called the album a "retro-psychedelic heavy rock platter, long on stripped-down riff muscle and surprisingly technically adept guitar jams."

Track listing 
All Music by Eddie Glass, Lyrics by Eddie Glass/Ruben Romano, except where noted
"To the Center"            6:31
"Come Down" 		    2:01
"Whatcha Lookin' For"  2:37
"Clearlight"		    4:29
"Freedom" 		    7:14
"Antigone"		    2:30
"I Need Somebody"          4:18 (Mark Arm on Vocals) (Written by Iggy Pop and James Williamson)
"So Low"		    3:45
"Synthetic Dream" 	    4:28
"Fields of Psilocybin"     2:15
"Between Time"             3:22 (Written by Randy Holden)
"You Mean Nothing" 	    4:21

Personnel
Eddie Glass – guitar, vocals, percussion
Ruben Romano – drums, vocals, percussion, sitar
Mark Abshire – bass, vocals, audio generator

Credits

Produced by Jack Endino & Nebula

Engineered by Jack Endino

Recorded at Hanzsek Audio, Seattle, April 1999

Except Track 6 recorded at Private Radio, Seattle, August 1998

Mastered by John Golden

All songs by Eddie Glass Volcanic  Pineapple (ASCAP)

Except Track 9 by Neil Blender & Eddie Glass

Track 7 by Iggy Pop/James Williamson, Bug Music/Fleur Music Limited/James

Osterberg Music/Screen Gems Music/ Strait James Music BMI

Track 11 by Randy Holden, Guitar God Music BMI

Front, Back, & Band Photos: Alex Obleas

Live Photos: Jenny Mcgee

Extra Collage Photos: Craig McDonald, Manu & Birgit

Cover Concept: Nebula

Cover Assembly: Mark Abshire

References

1999 albums
Nebula (band) albums
Sub Pop albums
Albums produced by Jack Endino